Gopal Sreenivasan is an American philosopher and Crown University Distinguished Professor in Ethics at Duke University. He is known for his works on ethics and political philosophy.

References

External links
Personal Website

21st-century American philosophers
Political philosophers
Philosophy academics
Living people
Year of birth missing (living people)
Duke University faculty
Distinguished professors of philosophy